Phallus macrosporus is a species of fungus in the stinkhorn family. It is found in China.

References

External links

Fungi of Asia
Fungi described in 1980
Phallales